The 1991 Scottish League Cup final was played on 27 October 1991 at Hampden Park in Glasgow and was the final of the 46th Scottish League Cup competition. The final was contested by Hibernian and Dunfermline Athletic. Hibernian won the match 2–0, thanks to goals from Tommy McIntyre and Keith Wright.

Route to the final

Hibernian
Scottish Premier Division club Hibernian (Hibs) entered the competition in the second round. They began their campaign with an away tie against Stirling Albion, but the match was in fact played at McDiarmid Park in Perth. This was because Annfield Stadium had an artificial turf, which gave visiting clubs the option of moving the match to a neutral venue. New signing Keith Wright scored in a 3–0 victory, then also scored in away victories against Kilmarnock and Ayr United.

Hibs were then drawn against league champions and League Cup holders Rangers. Hibs entered the match as underdogs, given Rangers' greater experience of playing in big matches and internationals. Wright gave Hibs the lead, however, exploiting an error by Andy Goram. This proved to be the only goal of the match, as John Burridge played well in goal for Hibs and both Mo Johnston and Ally McCoist missed chances for Rangers.

Dunfermline

Dunfermline Athletic, also a Scottish Premier Division club, entered the competition in the second round. Home victories against Alloa Athletic, St Mirren (after a penalty shootout) and Dundee United earned a place in a semi-final. Before the semi-final tie, however, Dunfermline sacked manager Iain Munro. The semi-final was played against Airdrieonians at Tynecastle. Dunfermline were losing 1–0 late in the game, but were controversially awarded a penalty kick by referee David Syme. The penalty was converted and Dunfermline progressed to the final by winning a penalty shootout.

Match details

Teams

References

Sources

1991
League Cup Final
Hibernian F.C. matches
Dunfermline Athletic F.C. matches
1990s in Glasgow
October 1991 sports events in the United Kingdom